The Bernina-Bahngesellschaft Fe 2/2 51, later known as the Rhaetian Railway Fe 2/2 51, and reclassified in 1965 as , is a metre gauge baggage railcar currently operated by the Rhaetian Railway (RhB), the main railway network in the Canton of Graubünden, Switzerland.

The railcar has been so named under the Swiss locomotive and railcar classification system.
According to that system, Fe 2/2 (to 1961) and De 2/2 (since 1962) denote a vehicle with a luggage compartment and a total of two axles, both of them drive axles.

Entry into service
In 1909, the then independent Bernina-Bahngesellschaft (BB) placed the railcar into service on the Bernina Railway.  Constructed by SIG and Alioth, it was originally classified as Fe2 51.

In 1943, the railcar entered service with the Rhaetian Railway, upon that railway's takeover of the BB.  The railcar has continued to operate on the Bernina Railway ever since the takeover.

Specifications

As delivered
The railcar's original timber bodywork gave it the external appearance of a goods wagon.  Its electrical equipment corresponded to that of a "halved" passenger carrying railcar of class BCe 4.

Modifications
Over time, the Rhaetian Railway altered a number of the railcar's specifications:

1951: the bow collector was replaced by a double-arm pantograph;
1961–62: the railcar was fitted with a new body, new controller box, and a compressed air shunting brake and track brake in addition to the existing vacuum brake;
1980: the body was clad in metal, and the pantograph was replaced by a single-arm unit.

Livery
While in service with the BB, the railcar was painted grey.  After the Rhaetian Railway takeover, it was initially liveried in green and later relivered in brown.  Since the early 1990s, it has carried a traffic orange livery.

Current operations
The railcar is currently used as a shunting locomotive – in the summer months mostly at Ospizio Bernina, and at other times in Poschiavo.

References

 

This article is based upon a translation of the German language version as at June 2012.

Railcars of Switzerland
Rhaetian Railway railcars
1000 V DC locomotives